Bellerose Composite High School is a high school located in northwest St. Albert, Alberta, Canada. It is a member of St. Albert Public Schools and was the second Protestant high school in St. Albert. Bellerose school opened in 1988, alleviating strain from Paul Kane High School, which at the time was overpopulated. Bellerose school was named after the Bellerose family, who came to the region in 1849 and built St. Albert's first school, which now resides in Fort Edmonton Park.

History 
The construction of Bellerose high school started in 1987.

References

External links
Bellerose Composite High School

Schools in St. Albert, Alberta
High schools in Alberta
International Baccalaureate schools in Alberta
School buildings completed in 1988
1988 establishments in Alberta